Kamalo may refer to:

Kamalo, Ivory Coast
Kamalo, Sierra Leone